Ziarat-e Seyyed Soleyman (also Romanized as Zīārat-e Seyyed Soleymān; also known as Zeyārat, Zīārat, and Zīyārat) is a village in Takht Rural District, Takht District, Bandar Abbas County, Hormozgan Province, Iran. At the 2006 census, its population was 806, in 182 families.

References 

Populated places in Bandar Abbas County